Oblatio vitae, meaning "the free offering (i.e. “oblation”) of [one's] life", is a category under which a person may be declared "Blessed" under the canonization procedures of the Roman Catholic church.

The category was created by Pope Francis in his Apostolic Letter Maiorem hac dilectionem (Greater love than this) issued on 11 July 2017.

Text of Apostolic Letter
Currently available in English.

References

Apostolic letters
Catholic canonical documents
Catholic Church legal terminology
Catholic procedural canon law